Among programmers, yet another (often abbreviated ya, Ya, or YA in the initial part of an acronym) is an idiomatic qualifier in the name of a computer program, organisation, or event that is confessedly unoriginal.

Stephen C. Johnson is credited with establishing the naming convention in the late 1970s when he named his compiler-compiler yacc (Yet Another Compiler-Compiler), since he felt there were already numerous compiler-compilers in circulation at the time.

Yet another…

Yabasic – Yet Another BASIC
Yaboot – Yet another boot loader
Yacc – Yet another compiler-compiler
Yacas – Yet another computer algebra system
YACP Yet Another Chat Protocol
YaDICs – Yet another Digital Image Correlation Software
YADIFA – Yet Another DNS Implementation For All
YafaRay – Yet another free Ray tracer
YAFFS – Yet Another Flash File System
YAGO – Yet Another Great Ontology
Yahoo! – Yet Another Hierarchical Officious Oracle [backronym]
Yakuake – Yet Another Kuake
YAM – Yet Another Mailer, an email client
YAML – Yet Another Markup Language. Later redefined to YAML Ain't Markup Language, making a recursive acronym
Yandex – Yet another indexer, a web search engine and index
YA-NewsWatcher – a Usenet client for classic Mac OS
YANG – Yet Another Next Generation 
YAP – Yet Another Previewer, document previewer
YAP – Yet Another Prolog, an implementation of the Prolog programming language
YAPC – Yet Another Perl Conference
YARN – Yet Another Resource Negotiator
YARP – Yet Another Robot Platform
YARV – Yet Another Ruby VM
Yasara – Yet Another Scientific Artificial Reality Application, a molecular modeling program
Yasca – Yet Another Source Code Analyzer
YAS – Yet Another Society, a non-profit organization organizing YAPCs
YASS – Yet Another Similarity Searcher, a pairwise nucleotide sequence alignment tool with dotplot
YaST – Yet another Setup Tool, an operating system installation and configuration wizard for SUSE Linux distributions
Y.A.S.U. – Yet Another SecuROM Utility
Yate – Yet Another Telephony Engine, VoIP software
YAWC – Yet Another Wersion of Citadel
YAWL – Yet Another Workflow Language, a business process modeling language for diagramming workflow patterns
Yaws – Yet another web server

See also
Another (disambiguation)
All articles starting with "Yet Another …" or "Yet another …"
Reinventing the wheel

References

Computer jargon